Cody Austin Sedlock (born June 19, 1995) is an American professional baseball pitcher who is a free agent. He made his MLB debut in 2022 for the Baltimore Orioles.

Amateur career
Sedlock attended Alleman High School in Rock Island, Illinois, and the University of Illinois, where he played college baseball for the Illinois Fighting Illini. As a freshman in 2014 he appeared in 12 games with three starts. He was 1–3 with a 3.41 earned run average (ERA) and 30 strikeouts. As a sophomore in 2015, he appeared in 21 games with two starts and went 4–0 with a 4.02 ERA and 29 strikeouts. After the 2015 season, he played collegiate summer baseball with the Bourne Braves of the Cape Cod Baseball League.

As a junior in 2016, Sedlock became a full-time starting pitcher. That year he was named the Big Ten Pitcher of the Year. During the season, he broke Illinois' single season strikeout record, previously held by John Ericks since 1988.

Professional career

Baltimore Orioles
The Baltimore Orioles selected Sedlock in the first round of the 2016 MLB draft. He made his professional debut that year with the Aberdeen IronBirds where he posted a 0–1 record with a 3.00 ERA in nine starts. In 2017, he played for the Frederick Keys where he went 4–5 with a 5.90 ERA in 20 starts. Sedlock missed part of the 2017 season dealing with a strained flexor mass in his elbow area. In 2018, Sedlock split the year between the Gulf Coast Orioles, Aberdeen, and Frederick, combining to go 0–3 with a 5.11 ERA in 36.1 innings. Sedlock missed time in 2018 while dealing with the effects of Thoracic outlet syndrome, though he ultimately avoided surgery for the ailment. Sedlock opened the 2019 season back with Frederick, before being promoted to the Bowie Baysox in July.  Over 22 games (16 starts) between the two clubs, he went 5-3 with a 2.84 ERA, striking out 100 batters over 95 innings.

On May 28, 2022, Baltimore selected Sedlock's contract and promoted him to the major leagues for the first time. He was designated for assignment on June 7, 2022, and cleared waivers and was sent outright to Triple-A on June 10.

Detroit Tigers
On July 10, 2022, Sedlock was traded to the Detroit Tigers for cash considerations. He was then assigned to the Toledo Mud Hens. He elected free agency on November 10, 2022.

References

External links

Illinois Fighting Illini bio

1995 births
Living people
People from Mercer County, Illinois
Baseball players from Illinois
Major League Baseball pitchers
Baltimore Orioles players
Illinois Fighting Illini baseball players
Bourne Braves players
Gulf Coast Orioles players
Aberdeen IronBirds players
Frederick Keys players
Bowie Baysox players
Norfolk Tides players
Waterloo Bucks players